Hygrophoropsis kivuensis is a species of fungus in the family Hygrophoropsidaceae. Found in the Republic of Congo, it was described as new to science in 1963 by Belgian botanist Paul Heinemann.

References

External links

Hygrophoropsidaceae
Fungi described in 1963
Fungi of Africa